also known as  is a reservoir that is located almost entirely within the town of Tsuruta in Aomori Prefecture, Japan, though a portion of its southern shore lies within the city of Hirosaki. It was built in 1660 to collect snowmelt in order to irrigate the fields in the surrounding area.

History
The reservoir's construction was ordered by Tsugaru Nobumasa, daimyō of the Hirosaki Domain in 1660 in order to collect water from snowmelt. Upon completion its  retaining wall became the longest embankment dam in Japan, a record it still holds. In 2010, it was selected by the Ministry of Agriculture, Forestry and Fisheries as one of the 100 best reservoirs in Japan.

References

External links

Landforms of Aomori Prefecture
Reservoirs in Japan
Tsuruta, Aomori
Hirosaki